The IS-2 was an intermediate training glider designed by Iosif Şilimon and built in Romania in the 1950s at the URMV-3 (Rom: Uzinele de Reparatii Material Volant-3 - Glider repair and manufacture factory) factory at Brașov.

Design and development
The IS-2 was designed as an intermediate training glider. Construction was largely of wood with fabric and plywood skinning, similar o the Grunau Baby pre-war German glider. Very little is known of the IS-2s development or operational history. Of conventional configuration with high-set cantilever wings and cruciform tail-unit, the IS-2 was also flown with an increased span wing.

Specifications (IS-2)

See also

Notes

References

1950s Romanian sailplanes
Glider aircraft
Aircraft first flown in 1950
High-wing aircraft